Eagle Gate College is a private for-profit college in the U.S. state of Utah that specializes in health career education. The college is accredited by the Accrediting Bureau of Health Education Schools and offers Bachelor's, associates, certificates, and diplomas in fields such as Medical Assisting, Nursing, Business Administration, and Criminal Justice. The Bachelor of Science in Nursing degree is accredited by the Commission on Collegiate Nursing Education. The college is located in Utah with campus locations in Murray, Provo, and Layton.  In addition to the campus locations, Eagle Gate College also offers programs online.

History
The school was founded in 1979 under the name of Intermountain College of Court Reporting. In July 2001, the school was acquired by Bullen and Wilson, LLC, and the name was changed to Eagle Gate College.

In February 2020, the school added a Master’s Entry Program in Nursing.

See also

 List of colleges and universities in Utah

References

External links

 

Private universities and colleges in Utah
Educational institutions established in 1979
Buildings and structures in Davis County, Utah
Universities and colleges in Salt Lake County, Utah
Schools in Salt Lake City
Education in Davis County, Utah
1979 establishments in Utah
For-profit universities and colleges in the United States